RY Sagittarii is a yellow supergiant and an R Coronae Borealis type variable star in the constellation Sagittarius. Although it ostensibly has the spectrum of a G-type star, it differs markedly from most in that it has almost no hydrogen and much carbon.

Discovery

Colonel Ernest Elliott Markwick first came across what became known as RY Sagittarii during searches for variable stars while posted in Gibraltar. He recorded it dimming from magnitude 7 in July 1893 to fainter than 11 by 23 October that year, and brightening to magnitude 6.4 by November 1894. Edward Charles Pickering wrote that it was a "remarkable object", and "nearly got away". The spectrum was first noted to be peculiar at the time, and by 1953 it was classified as a R Coronae Borealis variable, along with a handful of other stars.

Mystified by its origins, Danziger postulated possible explanations as forming from a helium cloud, an aged star that had exhausted its hydrogen, or a star that had somehow thrown off its hydrogen envelope, though noted there was no evidence of such an envelope. He conceded that knowledge of star evolution was not advanced enough to come up with an explanation.

Variability
It is one of the three brightest R Coronae Borealis stars visible to Earth observers, along with R Coronae Borealis and V854 Centauri, and the brightest in the southern hemisphere. It is also a pulsating variable, with a semiregular period of 38 days. Its light curve has been studied for over a hundred years and is typical for the class, characterised by a sudden drop in brightness of several magnitudes over a few weeks before gradually brightening over the following several months. The timing between these dimmings is irregular. The cause of the drop in magnitude is the presence of dust clouds of carbon obscuring (and most likely ejected from) the star, though the mechanism how this might occur is not known. Extensive clouds have been detected with ESO's Very Large Telescope Interferometer.

Properties
The star is so remote that its parallax, distance and hence luminosity were impossible to calculate with any accuracy. The distance derived indirectly by comparison with similar stars, is around 2,000 parsecs.

References 

Durchmusterung objects
180093
094730
7296
Sagittarii, RY
R Coronae Borealis variables
Sagittarius (constellation)